City Streets is a 1931 American Pre-Code film noir that is directed by Rouben Mamoulian from a story by Dashiell Hammett and stars Gary Cooper, Sylvia Sidney and Paul Lukas.

This Pre-Code crime film is about a racketeer's daughter, Nan, who is in love with a shooting gallery showman, who is known as The Kid. Despite her prodding, The Kid has no ambitions about joining the rackets and making enough money to support her in the lifestyle to which she is accustomed. Her father implicates her in a murder, and she is sent to prison. Her father then convinces The Kid to join the gang to free Nan.

Plot

Nan Cooley (Sylvia Sidney), the daughter of racketeer Pop Cooley (Guy Kibbee), is in love with The Kid (Gary Cooper), a shooting gallery showman. Cooley tries but fails to urge him to join the gang to earn enough money to support her in the lifestyle to which she is accustomed. Soon, her father kills the bootlegging chief Blackie (Stanley Fields) at the urging of Big Fella Maskal (Paul Lukas) since Blackie was against Maskal's involvement with Blackie's gun moll Aggie (Wynne Gibson).

After Pop shoots Blackie, he passes the gun to Nan, which implicates her in the murder. She naïvely takes the rap since she believes the mob will arrange for her acquittal, but she is sent to prison. Pop Cooley tries to convince The Kid to join the gang to free Nan, which he does out of love for her. However, her attitude had changed since she was railroaded to prison. When The Kid visits Nan in prison in a fur coat, she becomes terrified of his involvement with Pop's gang after she witnesses a fellow inmate's mobster boyfriend being gunned down outside the prison gate. When Nan is released, having served her term, she wants nothing more to do with the mob. She tries to persuade The Kid to quit the gang, but he refuses.

Things go downhill from there. She finds that her father is unrepentant and involved with a loose, gold-digging woman named Pansy (Betty Sinclair). Maskal soon takes a strong liking to Nan, throws her a homecoming party, and forces her to dance with him all evening. When The Kid finally asserts his claim over Nan, Maskal threatens him and sends his thugs to kill him, but The Kid successfully disarms them and goes after Maskal.

Terrified that her lover will be killed, Nan goes to Maskal to warn him and offers herself to him in exchange for The Kid's life. Aggie, now Maskal's mistress, shoots him with Nan's gun after he leaves her for Nan, and Nan is accused of murder. The Kid then names himself as mob chief and escapes with Nan in a car with three of Maskal's men, but they aim to kill him. The Kid and Nan are then taken "for a ride" by rival thugs. They race a train and maintain high speeds. Nan pulls a gun on the men and disarms them. Dropping the thugs off with "no hard feelings," The Kid tells them he has quit the beer business and drives off with Nan.

Cast (in credits order)
 Gary Cooper as The Kid
 Sylvia Sidney as Nan Cooley
 Paul Lukas as Big Fellow Maskal
 William "Stage" Boyd as McCoy
 Wynne Gibson as Aggie
 Guy Kibbee as Pop Cooley
 Stanley Fields as Blackie
 Betty Sinclair as Pansy
 Robert Homans as Police Inspector

Reception
In 2008, the American Film Institute nominated this film for its Top 10 Gangster Films list.

References

External links
 
 
 
 

1931 films
1931 crime drama films
1930s English-language films
American black-and-white films
American crime drama films
Films directed by Rouben Mamoulian
Films set in New York City
Paramount Pictures films
Films based on works by Dashiell Hammett
1930s American films